Jérémy Gagnon-Laparé (born March 9, 1995) is a Canadian professional soccer player who currently plays for York United.

Club career

Montreal Impact
On May 7, 2014, Gagnon-Laparé made his professional debut for the Montreal Impact in a 2–1 defeat to FC Edmonton in the Canadian Championship. Gagnon-Laparé signed his first professional contract with the Montreal Impact on July 3, 2014. He made his debut against Real Salt Lake on July 24, 2014. Gagnon-Laparé joined Ottawa Fury FC on loan for the rest of the 2015 NASL season on October 6, 2015. After 3 seasons with the Impact, the club announced they would not pick up Gagnon-Laparé's contract option for the 2017 season.

Vitré
After trialling with Stade Rennais in late 2016, Gagnon-Laparé signed with CFA club AS Vitré in January 2017. He would spend 18 months at the club before departing at the end of the 2017–18 season.

Ottawa Fury
Gagnon-Laparé was signed by Ottawa Fury FC on July 16, 2018. In November 2018, The Fury announced Gagnon-Laparé would return for a second season in 2019. After two seasons with the Fury, the club would cease operations for the 2020 season, making Gagnon-Laparé a free agent.

Saint Louis FC
Following Ottawa ceasing operations and moving to Miami, Gagnon-Laparé stayed in the USL Championship with Saint Louis FC ahead of their 2020 season. With St. Louis City SC starting play in MLS in 2023, Saint Louis FC would fold at the end of the 2020 season, ending Gagnon-Laparés time at the club after one season.

HFX Wanderers
On January 20, 2021, Gagnon-Laparé signed a two-year contract with an option for 2023 with Canadian Premier League side HFX Wanderers. In December 2022, his contract option was declined, ending his time with the club after two seasons.

York United
Shortly after leaving the HFX Wanderers, Gagnon-Laparé signed with fellow CPL team York United on a two-year deal.

International career
Gagnon-Laparé has represented Canada at the U-18 level. On August 27, 2013, he received his first call up to the Canada national team by new manager Benito Floro for two friendlies against Mauritania on September 8 and 10.  He made his international debut in the first friendly which ended in a goalless draw.

After being a mainstay with Floro and the senior team for most of 2014, Gagnon-Laparé was called into the U20 team by coach Rob Gale on November 7, 2014. He made his debut in a friendly against England's U-20 side five days later and played the full 90 minutes in a 2–2 draw.

In May 2016, Gagnon-Lapare was called to Canada's U23 national team for a pair of friendlies against Guyana and Grenada. He saw action in both matches.

Career statistics

References

External links
 
 
 USSF Development Academy bio

1995 births
Living people
Canadian soccer players
Association football midfielders
Soccer people from Quebec
Sportspeople from Sherbrooke
French Quebecers
Canadian expatriate soccer players
Expatriate soccer players in the United States
Canadian expatriate sportspeople in the United States
Montreal Impact U23 players
CF Montréal players
FC Montreal players
Ottawa Fury FC players
AS Vitré players
Saint Louis FC players
HFX Wanderers FC players
Canadian Soccer League (1998–present) players
USL League Two players
Major League Soccer players
USL Championship players
North American Soccer League players
Canada men's youth international soccer players
Canada men's under-23 international soccer players
Canada men's international soccer players
2015 CONCACAF U-20 Championship players
Footballers at the 2015 Pan American Games
Homegrown Players (MLS)
Pan American Games competitors for Canada